In mathematics, the Fitting lemma – named after the mathematician Hans Fitting – is a basic statement in abstract algebra. Suppose M is a module over some ring. If M is indecomposable and has finite length, then every endomorphism of M is either an automorphism or nilpotent.

As an immediate consequence, we see that the endomorphism ring of every finite-length indecomposable module is local.

A version of Fitting's lemma is often used in the representation theory of groups. This is in fact a special case of the version above, since every K-linear representation of a group G can be viewed as a module over the group algebra KG.

Proof 

To prove Fitting's lemma, we take an endomorphism f of M and consider the following two chains of submodules:

 The first is the descending chain ,
 the second is the ascending chain 

Let now , and note that by construction  and 

We claim that . Indeed, every  satisfies  for some  but also , so that , therefore  and thus 

Moreover, : for every , there exists some  such that  (since ), and thus , so that  and thus 

(This statement is also known as the Fitting decomposition theorem.) Depending on which of the two summands is zero, we find that  is either bijective or nilpotent.

Notes

References 
 

Module theory
Lemmas in algebra